Fencing was contested at the 2015 Summer Universiade from July 4 to 9 at the Kim Dae-Jung Convention Center in Gwangju, South Korea.

Medal summary

Medal table

Men's events

Women's events

References

External links
2015 Summer Universiade – Fencing

2015 in fencing
Fencing at the Summer Universiade
2015 Summer Universiade events
International fencing competitions hosted by South Korea